Vachan (Hindi: वचन English: Word) is a 1955 Indian Bollywood film directed by Raj Rishi and produced by Devendra Goel. The film stars Geeta Bali and Rajendra Kumar in lead roles.
The film marked the debut of composer Ravi. It was also Rajendra Kumar's first major film role. It received two nominations at the annual Filmfare Awards.

Plot
Kamla (Geeta Bali) lives a poor lifestyle in a small town in Uttar Pradesh along with her widowed dad, Dinanath, who works as an accountant, and two younger brothers, Kumar and Kishore. Her father's biggest dream is to get Kamla married to her lover, a wealthy man named Prem (Balraj), and ensure that Kumar and Kishore get properly educated. As Dinanath's eyesight deteriorates, the quality of his work deteriorates and he loses his job. However, his employer, Laxmidas (Madan Puri), promises to hire Dinanath's son Kumar once he completes his education. On the day of the results, Kumar dies in an accident. Devastated and desperate, Dinanath tries to commit suicide, but he is hospitalised. Later he recovers but loses his vision completely. Kamla's wedding is consequently cancelled, and Prem reluctantly marries Shyama. Kamla starts working and takes it upon herself to look after her dad and Kishore. Years pass by, Kishore (Rajendra Kumar) has grown up, graduates, gets a job and marries a young girl named Tara (Neelma), who happens ro be the niece of Kashiram, Prem's friend. The family settles down to a fairly harmonious relationship which is shattered when Kishore and Tara accuse Kamla of stealing household items; following this incident, Kamla and her dad leave the house, and Kamla soon gets a job as a nurse for a sick Shyama, while her husband Prem is absent, without knowing that she is actually her ex-lover's wife.

Cast
Geeta Bali as Kamla
Rajendra Kumar as Kishore
Madan Puri as Laxmidas

Music
The song "Chanda Mama Door Ke" became very popular. Its opening bars were used in the hit song "Ek Do Teen" of the 1988 film Tezaab.

Awards
The film received two nominations at the 1956 Filmfare Awards. Geeta Bali received her first and only competitive Best Actress nomination at the Filmfare (she was a Best Supporting Actress nominee in 1956). Nominations are listed below:
Nominated, Filmfare Best Actress Award - Geeta Bali
Nominated, Filmfare Best Story Award - Mukhram Sharma

References

External links

1955 films
1950s Hindi-language films
Films scored by Ravi
Indian drama films
1955 drama films
Indian black-and-white films